On the Third Day is the third studio album by Electric Light Orchestra (ELO), and the first to be recorded without input from Roy Wood. It was released in the United States in November 1973 by United Artists Records, and in the United Kingdom on 14 December 1973 by Warner Bros. Records. From this album on, the word The was dropped from the band's name. The album was reissued on 12 September 2006.

Release

On the Third Day was released in 1973 and failed to enter the UK charts at the time, although it did reach the US charts at number 52. Side two of the album was recorded during or shortly after the sessions for ELO's second album ELO 2. On The Third Day contains shorter tracks than its predecessor, but the four songs on side one of the album were linked into a continuous suite. Violinist Mik Kaminski made his debut on side one of this album, replacing Wilfred Gibson, although Gibson plays on side two (plus the bonus tracks). Also, cellist Colin Walker left the line up around the same time, leaving Mike Edwards as lone cellist.
	
"Showdown" was originally intended to be released only as a single, and, because it was on a different label (Harvest) than the UK album, "Showdown" did not appear on the  Warner Bros. Records issue. It was, however, included on the U.S. version of the album, because the band remained on United Artists Records in the U.S. Some copies of On the Third Day from this period had "Showdown" as the last track on side one. Although he didn't record on the album, Hugh McDowell did appear on this front cover of the U.S. album seen at right, which was an unusual photograph taken by photographer Richard Avedon that had ELO displaying their navels.

Track listing

Original track listing

Personnel
Jeff Lynne – vocals, guitars
Bev Bevan – drums, percussion
Richard Tandy – piano, Moog, clavinet, Wurlitzer electric piano
Mike de Albuquerque – bass, backing vocals
Mike Edwards – cello
Mik Kaminski – violin (on tracks 1–4)
Ted Blight – cello (credited on the UK pressing, but said to be a figment of Lynne's imagination)

Additional personnel
Wilf Gibson – violin (on tracks 5–14)
Colin Walker – cello (on tracks 5–14)
 Marc Bolan - co-lead guitar (Ma Ma Ma Belle, Dreaming of 4000,  Everyone's Born to Die)

Chart positions

Notes
A ^ Peaked the week of 20 October 2006 when Epic Records Japan released the remastered CD.

References

External links
 On the Third Day Remastered Info at ftmusic

Electric Light Orchestra albums
Albums produced by Jeff Lynne
Albums with cover art by Hipgnosis
Warner Records albums
United Artists Records albums
Jet Records albums
1973 albums
Albums recorded at AIR Studios